The 2015 TVB Star Awards Malaysia, presented by TVB Entertainment News, Astro, MY FM, and MELODY FM in Malaysia, is an awards ceremony that recognises the best Hong Kong TVB television programmes that aired on Malaysia's Astro On Demand and Astro Wah Lai Toi in 2015. It was held on 28 November 2015 at Arena of Stars in Genting Highlands, Pahang, Malaysia, and was broadcast live through Malaysia's Astro Wah Lai Toi and Hong Kong's TVB Entertainment news channel.

The awards ceremony was officially announced on 13 October 2015, and presented 13 nomination categories. Nominees were announced on 16 October through a mobile app for Android. The Malaysian public are able to vote for their favourite stars by casting votes on the app. The voting period lasted from 16 October to 21 November 2015.

Captain of Destiny won six awards, including My Favourite TVB Drama and My Favourite Actor (Ruco Chan). Kristal Tin and Nancy Wu were both tied for My Favourite TVB Actress, making it the first year in which two Best Actress awards were given out.

Winners and nominees
Top 3 nominations are listed first and in bold face.

Programs

Acting and hosting

References

External links
Official Instagram

TVB original programming
2015 television awards
2015 in Hong Kong television
Genting Highlands